The Australian Centre for Field Robotics (ACFR) is dedicated to the research and teaching of concepts relating to intelligent autonomous systems, at The University of Sydney in NSW, Australia. Originally established as an ARC Key Centre of Teaching and Research in 1999, it now forms part of the ARC Centre of Excellence for Autonomous Systems, along with groups at the University of Technology, Sydney and the University of New South Wales.

Research direction

The Centre undertakes research in a broad range of areas related to the perception, control and learning capabilities of land, air and sea-based autonomous systems. Work at the ACFR is directed to the perception and systems aspects of this larger research area, specifically:

Perception
Sensor Construction and Deployment
Sensor Representation
Measurement in the presence of uncertainty
Decentralised fusion (DDF) of data from disparate and/or dislocated sensors
Systems
Modelling of large-scale systems
Design

See also 

 University of Sydney
 University of New South Wales
 University of Technology, Sydney
 Australian Research Council

References

External links 

 The Australian Centre for Field Robotics (outdated)
 Centre for Autonomous Systems
 CAS Annual Report, 2005
 Centre Publications

Robotics organizations
Robotics in Australia